The  is an electric locomotive built for the Japanese Government Railways formerly operated on freight services in Japan from 1934 until 1983.

History
41 locomotives were built between 1934 and 1941 by the manufacturers Hitachi, Kawasaki Heavy Industries, Kisha Seizo, Mitsubishi, and Toshiba.

Locomotive construction was divided into four batches, with further differences within individual batches as follows.

EF10 1 - 16
Locomotives EF10 1 to 16 had bodies with similar styling to the Class ED16 and Class EF53 locomotives.

EF10 17
EF10 17 was built in 1937 with a welded body and more rounded styling.

EF10 18 - 19
Locomotives EF10 18 and 19 continued with the same rounded body styling as EF10 17, but used a similar bar frame bogie design to the first batch of locomotives.

EF10 20 - 24
Locomotives EF10 20 to 24 continued with the same body design, but with a different ventilator arrangement.

EF10 25 - 29
Locomotives EF10 25 to 29 had welded bodies, but reverted to a more angular design.

EF10 30 - 33
Locomotives EF10 30 to 33 continued with the same welded angular body design, but used cast bogie frames.

EF10 34 - 41
Locomotives EF10 34 to 41 used the original bar frame bogie design.

Preservation 

EF10 35 was preserved in a park in Moji-ku, Kitakyushu before being restored and moved to the newly opened Kyushu Railway History Museum in 2003, where it is preserved statically.

Classification

The EF10 classification for this locomotive type is explained below.
 E: Electric locomotive
 F: Six driving axles
 10: Locomotive with maximum speed 85 km/h or less

See also
 Railway electrification in Japan

References

Further reading
 
 
 

Electric locomotives of Japan
1500 V DC locomotives
1067 mm gauge locomotives of Japan
Railway locomotives introduced in 1934
Hitachi locomotives
Kawasaki locomotives
Kisha Seizo locomotives
Mitsubishi locomotives
Toshiba locomotives
(1′Co)+(Co1′) locomotives